Mount Loch is a mountain in the Victorian Alps of the Great Dividing Range, located in the Australian state of Victoria.

See also

Alpine National Park
List of mountains in Victoria

References

Sources

Mountains of Victoria (Australia)
Victorian Alps
Mountains of Hume (region)